Cochylimorpha lungtangensis is a species of moth of the family Tortricidae. It is found in China (Gansu, Guizhou, Hebei, Henan, Jiangsu, Liaoning, Ningxia, Qinghai, Shaanxi, Shanxi, Sichuan, Tianjin).

References

Moths described in 1964
Cochylimorpha
Taxa named by Józef Razowski
Moths of Asia